Fita Bayisa (Amharic: ፊጣ ባይሳ; born December 15, 1972 in Ambo, Oromia) is an Ethiopian long-distance runner, most known for winning a bronze medal on the 5000 metres at the 1992 Summer Olympics. A year before he had won a silver medal at the World Championships in Tokyo. Before the Olympic Games in Barcelona, Bayisa had emerged as the favourite for 10,000 metres, as he had defeated a world-class field at the Bislett Games in Oslo in a time of 27:14.26 min. However, he failed to make an impact on the 10,000 m final, which was won by Khalid Skah.

Among his other achievements, he was the winner of the 1999 Belgrade Race Through History. He beat Paul Tergat by a second in the unusual race across Belgrade's city fortress.

Personal bests
1500 metres - 3:35.35 (1999)
3000 metres - 7:35.32 (1996)
5000 metres - 13:05.40 (1993)
10,000 metres - 27:14.26 (1992)
8 kilometres - 22:22 (2000)
5 miles road - 22:29 (2000)

Achievements

References

External links

1972 births
Living people
Ethiopian male long-distance runners
Athletes (track and field) at the 1992 Summer Olympics
Athletes (track and field) at the 1996 Summer Olympics
Athletes (track and field) at the 2000 Summer Olympics
Olympic bronze medalists for Ethiopia
Olympic athletes of Ethiopia
World Athletics Championships medalists
Medalists at the 1992 Summer Olympics
Olympic bronze medalists in athletics (track and field)
African Games gold medalists for Ethiopia
African Games medalists in athletics (track and field)
Athletes (track and field) at the 1991 All-Africa Games
20th-century Ethiopian people